Dexosarcophaga is a genus of flies.

List of species
D. transita Townsend, 1917
D. wyatti Mello-Patiu & Pape, 2000

References

Sarcophagidae
Muscomorpha genera